Kızkalesi is a town in Mersin Province, Turkey. The town, known in Antiquity as Corycus or Korykos, is named after the ancient castle built on a small island just facing the town.

Geography 
Kızkalesi is a Mediterranean coastal town. Taurus mountains are at north of the town and in fact some quarters of the town are situated on the lower slopes of the mountain. The surrounding area is mostly covered by maquis shrubland.

Kızkalesi is west of Erdemli and Mersin. The winter (settled) population was 1,687 as of 2012. But in summers, much higher population figures can be reached due to tourism.

People and history

Ancient Corycus was a large city. It became part of the Seleucid Empire, the Roman Empire, the Byzantine Empire, the various Seljuk empires, the Armenian Kingdom of Cilicia, Beylik of Karaman, and finally the Ottoman Empire. In Turkish history, it is known as Prince Cem Sultan's departing point from Turkey in 1482 after his defeat in an Ottoman civil war on his way to Rome. After Cem’s departure, Kızkalesi became the winter settlement of nomadic Turkmen tribes known as Ayaş. It was declared as a seat of township in 1992.

Economy 
The most important economic activities are agriculture and tourism. Tomatoes, cucumbers, apricots, beans, and citrus are the most cultivated crops. With widespread historical ruins and wide beaches, the touristic potential of the town is notable, but Kızkalesi's tourism economy is not yet up to international standards.

At Mediterranean Games
The beach of Kızkalesi hosted beach volleyball at the 2013 Mediterranean Games held in Mersin.

References

External links 

Populated places in Mersin Province
Populated coastal places in Turkey
Seaside resorts in Turkey
Towns in Turkey
Tourist attractions in Mersin Province
Populated places in Erdemli District
2013 Mediterranean Games venues